Conor Paul Maynard (born 21 November 1992) is an English singer. Born and raised in Brighton, he signed a recording contract with Warner Music Group in 2011. Maynard rose to fame in 2012 when he was nominated for, and subsequently won, MTV's Brand New for 2012 award. His debut album, Contrast, was released in July 2012 which produced the successful single “Can't Say No".

Life and career

1992–2011: Early life and career
Conor Paul Maynard was born in Brighton, England to Gary and Helen Maynard, a builder and office worker, respectively. He has a younger brother, Jack who is a YouTuber and he briefly appeared on the 2017 series of I'm a Celebrity...Get Me Out of Here!. Conor Maynard has his own YouTube Channel as well. His younger sister Anna who is also a YouTuber has appeared in some of his covers on YouTube, including "Run" and  "If I Were A Boy" and she was the host of Got What It Takes?. He attended Cardinal Newman Catholic School in Hove. On 19 May 2006, he signed up to the online video-sharing website YouTube and in December 2008 uploaded his very first video of him singing "Breathe", by fellow British musician Lee Carr.

In 2006, Maynard starred as a young annoying  Casper Rose in the Sky 1 television series Dream Team.

Since 2009, Maynard has uploaded cover versions of songs with rapper and close friend, Anthony "Anth" Melo, who resides in Virginia. Together they have covered a variety of songs, including: Taio Cruz ("Dynamite") and Rihanna ("Only Girl (In the World)"). Maynard came to label attention when American singer/songwriter Ne-Yo watched a cover version of his track "Beautiful Monster" – who contacted the musician soon afterwards, and Ne-Yo became Maynard's mentor. He signed to EMI/Parlophone and Turn First management.

Turn First were responsible for developing the artist. CEO Sarah Stennett told HitQuarters that rather than telling him what songs to sing, they guided him through the songwriting process, finding what music he was listening to and what was inspiring him, and then matched him up with producers The Invisible Men and songwriter Sophie Stern. These sessions eventually resulted in first single "Can't Say No". Stennett described the song as "a tastemaker track. It sounded like something he was listening to, which was urban radio."

In November 2011, Maynard received a nomination for MTV's Brand New for 2012 award, competing alongside Delilah, Michael Kiwanuka, Lana Del Rey, and Lianne La Havas. It was announced on 31 January 2012 that Maynard had been crowned winner of the award, having received approximately 48% of the public vote.

Maynard signed to Parlophone in late 2010. He released the music video for his debut single "Can't Say No" on 1 March 2012, which by September 2012 had already surpassed fourteen million views.

The single was met with positive reviews, with Lewis Corner (of Digital Spy) describing it as "playful, fun and immediately leaves you wanting another go", while others compared Maynard to singer Justin Bieber. Maynard largely disputed this comparison, stating "I'm not like Justin Bieber", but allowed that both gained popularity from being young and from being found through YouTube.

2012–2013: Contrast
Maynard's debut single, "Can't Say No", was released in the United Kingdom on 15 April 2012 – debuting at number two on the UK Singles Chart for the week ending 28 April with 74,792 copies sold. The track also saw chart success in Ireland, where it peaked at number thirteen. On 1 May, Maynard released the album track "Drowning" as a free download for any fans who pre-ordered the upcoming studio album Contrast. On 5 May, he performed "Can't Say No" at the 7th annual edition of the TRL Awards in Italy. On 9 June 2012, Maynard performed "Can't Say No" at the Capital Summertime Ball in front of an 80,000 strong crowd.

Maynard released his second single, "Vegas Girl", on 21 July 2012 in the UK – it debuted and peaked at number 4 on the UK Singles Chart. On 30 July, he released Contrast, which debuted at number 1 on the UK Album Chart on 11 August 2012. The album sold only 17,000 copies in its debut week. He released the third single from the album "Turn Around", featuring Ne-Yo. It peaked at number 8 on the UK singles chart.

2013–2017: Take Off and Covers

It was revealed in June 2013 that Maynard would release a book offering fans an insight into his rise to fame, entitled Take Off; it was released in October 2013. Maynard is currently preparing for the release of his second studio album. He has promised a new sound for the album and has confirmed that he has worked with Labrinth and Travie McCoy on the album.

On 23 August, Maynard confirmed that his new single would be called "R U Crazy", which was produced by Labrinth. The song premiered on radio on 25 August, as well as the music video appearing on 27 August.

In March 2014, Maynard took part in recording England's 2014 World Cup song. He collaborated with the likes of fellow pop stars Melanie C, Eliza Doolittle, Emma Bunton, Katy B, Kimberley Walsh, and Pixie Lott, on "Greatest Day", a track originally performed by a British band, Take That. The track was produced by Gary Barlow and recorded at Sarm Studios in London. The track also featured past footballers such as Gary Lineker, Michael Owen, Geoff Hurst, David Seaman, Peter Shilton, Glenn Hoddle, and Dion Dublin on backing vocals.

On 1 March 2015, Conor released his new single "Talking About", the second single from the upcoming album. The single debuted at number 44 on the UK Singles Chart, becoming not only Maynard's first single to miss the top-ten, but also his first to miss the top-forty altogether. Within a month Conor released his third single called "Royalty". The single is extracted from his second upcoming album, which is predicted to be released at the beginning of 2016.

On 22 January 2016, the single "I'm Famous" by Marcus Butler was released featuring Maynard. It peaked at number 85 on the UK Singles Chart top 100, failing to reach the top 40. The single spent only one week on the chart. Maynard was also featured alongside Butler in the music video for the same song.

Conor performed at the Hertfordshire Summer Ball on 13 May 2016, along with other acts such as Becky Hill.

In July 2016, due to the success of his covers on YouTube, Conor announced he would be releasing an album of covers with one original track. A few of the covers included "Pillowtalk", "One Dance", "Hello" and "Stitches". The original was called "This Is My Version" and was written about a relationship he had previously been in. The album, Covers was released on 5 August 2016.

Maynard featured on a dance track called "Dancing in the Headlights" by DJ Antoine. Maynard also featured on a track called "Catch Me Here" by Drumsound and Bassline Smith which Conor had already written for 2 years. On 23 December 2016 he released the single "Are You Sure?" with Kris Kross Amsterdam featuring vocals from Ty Dolla Sign.

2018–present: Broadway and new music 
In November 2018, Maynard began starring in the Broadway production of Kinky Boots at the Al Hirschfeld Theatre in the lead role of Charlie Price and gave his final performance on 10 January 2019.

On 12 November 2021, Maynard released the single "What I Put You Through", which he co-wrote, adding it was the “most personal song [he’d] ever released”. On 19 November 2021, the single charted at number 40 on the UK Singles Sales Chart but failed to chart on the UK Top 100.

Discography

Albums

Singles

As lead artist

As featured artist

Other charted songs

Promotional singles

Production credits

Songwriting credits

Notes

married chelsie

Filmography

As actor

Television

References

External links

 

1992 births
Living people
21st-century British male singers
21st-century English singers
British contemporary R&B singers
Capitol Records artists
EMI Records artists
English male singers
English pop singers
English YouTubers
Parlophone artists
People from Brighton